The World Flying Disc Federation (WFDF) is the international governing body for flying disc (Frisbee) sports, with responsibility for sanctioning world championship events, establishing uniform rules, setting of standards for and recording of world records.  WFDF is a federation of member associations which represent flying disc sports and their athletes in 100 countries.  WFDF is an international federation recognized by the International Olympic Committee (IOC), a member of the Association of IOC Recognised International Sports Federations (ARISF), GAISF, and the International World Games Association (IWGA), and it is a registered not-for-profit 501(c)(3) corporation in the state of Colorado, U.S.

Membership
WFDF has member associations in 118 countries (90+28) (in March 2022), from Africa, Asia, Australia, Europe, North America, The Caribbean and South America (regular members and provisional members).

WFDF is a not-for-profit corporation, incorporated in Colorado, US, and it was formed in 1985.

WFDF is a member of Global Association of International Sports Federations (formerly known as SportAccord), The International World Games Association (IWGA), and the International Council of Sport Science and Physical Education (ICSSPE). In May 2013, under the leadership of WFDF President Robert L. "Nob" Rauch, WFDF was granted provisional recognition by the International Olympic Committee and gained full IOC recognition on 2 August 2015.

It is now one of 42 sports that are members of the Association of IOC Recognised International Sports Federations.

Members by regions

118 members (90 regular members and 28 provisional members):

Asia Oceania Flying Disc Federation (AOFDF)
Asia Oceania Flying Disc Federation (AOFDF) - (governing body of Asian and Oceanic Flying Disc) (one of the continental association of the World Flying Disc Federation).

AFDF: 2011-2019 - Asian Flying Disc Federation
AOFDF: 2019-now - Asia Oceania Flying Disc Federation

On 3 December 2011, was founded in Kaohsiung, Chinese Taipei (2011 WFDF Asia Oceanic Ultimate Championship (AOUC)).

Foundation meeting: Chinese Taipei, Hong Kong, India, Japan, and Singapore.

Events:
2011: Asia Oceanic Ultimate Championships, Kaohsiung, Chinese Taipei
2013: Asia Oceanic Ultimate Club Championships, Singapore
2015: Asia Oceanic Ultimate Championships, Hong Kong, China
2017: Asia Oceanic Ultimate and Guts Club Championships, Manila, Philippines
2019: Asia Oceanic Beach Ultimate Championships, Shirahama, Japan
2019: Asia Oceanic Ultimate and Guts Championships, Shanghai, China
2019: AOFDF Juniors and Masters Ultimate Championships, Manila, Philippines

Members (25+3):

Asia:
 
 
 
 
 
 
 
 
 
 
 
 
 
 
 
 
 
 
 
 
 
 
 
 
 

Oceania:
 
 
 

Other:

European Flying Disc Federation (EFDF)/European Ultimate Federation (EUF)
European Flying Disc Federation (EFDF)
European Ultimate Federation (EUF)

List

Federations
    Int. | Freestyle Players Association (FPA)
    Int. | Guts Players Association (USGPA)

Nations

Regular members

    , Albania | Albania Flying Disc Federation (AFDF)
    , Argentina | Asociación de Deportes del Disco Volador de la Republica Argentina (ADDVRA)
    , Australia | Australian Flying Disc Association Inc. (AFDA)
    , Austria | Österreichischer Frisbee-Sport Verband (ÖFSV)
    , Azerbaijan | Azerbaijan Ultimate (AU)
    , Barbados | Barbados Hat (BH)
    , Belgium | Belgian Flying Disc Federation (BFDF)
    , Bermuda | Bermuda Ultimate Frisbee Federation (BUFF)
    , Botswana | Gaborone Ultimate Community (BWA)
    , Brazil | Federacio Paulista de Disco (FPD)
    , Canada | Ultimate Canada (UC)
    , People's Republic of China | Chinese Flying Disc Administrative Committee (CFDAC)
    , Côte d'Ivoire| Fédération Ivoirienne De Frisbee (FIDF)
    , Democratic Republic of Congo | Federation Congolaise de Disque Volant (FCDV)
    , Colombia | Federación Colombiana de Disco Volador (FECODV)
    , Cuba | Cuba Ultimate Frisbee (CUF)
    , Czech Republic | Czech Flying Disc Association (CALD)
    , Denmark | Dansk Frisbee Sport Union (DFSU)
    , Dominican Republic | Asociacion Dominicana de Jugadores de Ultimate (ADJU)
    , Ecuador | Ecuador Ultimate (EU)
    , Egypt | Egyptian Ultimate Players Association (EUPA)
    , El Salvador | San Salvador Ultimate Frisbee (SSUF)
    , Spain | Federación Española de Disco Volador (FEDV)
    , Estonia | Estonian Flying Disc Federation (EFDF)
    , Ethiopia | Ethiopia Ultimate (ETH)
    , Fiji | Frisbee Fiji (FF)
    , Finland | Finnish Flying Disc Association (FFDA)
    , France | Federation Française de Flying Disc (FFFD)
    , Great Britain | UK Ultimate Ltd (UKU) / , United Kingdom |British Disc Golf Association (BDGA)
    , Georgia | Georgian Flying Disc Federation (GFDF)
    , Germany | Deutscher Frisbeesport-Verband e.V. (DFV)
    , Greece | Greece Hellas Sport for All (HSA)
    , Guatemala | Guatemala City Ultimate Frisbee (GCUF)
    , Guam | Guam Ultimate for All Association (GUFA)
    , Haiti | Haiti Flying Disc (FD)
    , Hong Kong, China | Hong Kong Ultimate Players Association (HKUPA)
    , Hungary | Hungarian Flying Disc Federation (HFDF)
    , India | Ultimate Players Association of India (UPAI)
    , Ireland | Irish Flying Disc Association (IFDA)
    , Iceland | Frisbee Sport Federation of Iceland (ICELAND)
    , Israel | The Israeli Flying Discs Association (IFDA)
    , Italy | Federazione Italiana Flying Disc (FIFD)
    , Jamaica | Jamaica Ultimate (JU)
    , Japan | Japan Flying Disc Association (JFDA)
    , Republic of Korea | Korea Ultimate Players Association (KUPA)
    , Saudi Arabia | Ultimate Frisbee Saudi Arabia Amateurmannschaft (UFSA)
    , Kuwait | Kuwait Raptors (KR)
    , Latvia | Latvian Flying Disc Federation (LFDF)
    , Lithuania | Lithuania Flying Disc Federation (LFDF)
    , Luxembourg | Luxembourg Flying Disc Federation (LU)
    , Macau, China | Macau Ultimate (MU)
    , Madagascar | Malagasy Ultimate Disc League (MUDL)
    , Morocco | The Moroccan Flying Disc Association (UFMT)
    , Malaysia | Malaysian Flying Disc Association (MYFDA)
    , Mexico | Ultimate México (MEX)
    , Mali | Association Malienne de Flying Disc (AMFD)
    , Malta | Malta Sport for All (MSF)
    , Mauritius | Mauritius Ultimate Frisbee (UFM)
    , Mozambique | Mozambique Ultimate (MOZ)
    , Netherlands | Dutch Flying Disc Federation (NFB)
    , Nigeria | Abuja Ultimate Frisbee Group (NIG)
    , Norway | Norges Amerikanske Idretters Forbund
    , New Zealand | New Zealand Ultimate Inc. (NZU)
    , Panama | Asociacion de Ultimate – Frisbee de Panamá (PU)
    , Peru | Peru Ultimate (PU)
    , Philippines | Philippine Ultimate Association (PUA)
    , Palestine | Palestine Flying Disc Association (PFDA)
    , Poland | Polskie Stowarzyszenie Graczy Ultimate (PUPA)
    , Portugal | Federação Portuguesa de Ultimate e Desportos de Disco (APUDD)
    , Puerto Rico | Extreme Flydisk Ultimate Association (PR)
    , South Africa | South African Flying Disc Association (SAFDA)
    , Russian Federation | Russian Flying Disc Federation (RFDF)
    , Senegal | Senegal Ultimate (SEN)
    , Singapore | Singapore Ultimate Players Association (UPAS)
    , Slovenia | Frizbi zveza Slovenije (FZS)
    , Serbia | Serbian Ultimate Frisbee (RS)
    , Switzerland | Swiss Disc Sports (SDS) / , Switzerland | Swiss Discgolf Association
    , Slovakia | Slovak Association of Frisbee (SAF)
    , Sweden | Swedish Frisbeesport Federation (SFF)
    , Thailand | Flying Disc Association of Thailand (FDAT)
    , Turkmenistan | Turkmenistan Flying Disc Federation (TFDF)
    , Chinese Taipei | Chinese Taipei Flying Disc Association (CTFDA)
    , Turkey | Turkish Flying Disc Association (TFDA)
    , United Arab Emirates | United Arabian Ultimate (UAU)
    , Uganda | Uganda Ultimate Frisbee Association (UUFA)
    , Ukraine | Ukrainian Flying Disk Federation(UFDF)
    , United States of America | USA Ultimate (USAU)
    , Venezuela | Venezuelan Ultimate Association (AVU)
    , Vietnam | Hanoi Ultimate Club (HUC)
    , Zimbabwe | HIS group (HIS)

Provisional members
    , Afghanistan | Afghanistan Frisbee Federation (AFF)
    , Armenia | Armenian National Frisbee Federation (ANFF)
    , Belarus | Belarusian Flying Disc Federation (BFDF)
    , Bolivia | Bolivian Flying Disc Association (BFDA)
    , Bahrain | Bahrain Flying Disc Association (BFDA) 
    , Brunei | Brunei Flying Disc Association (BFDA)
    , Bulgaria | Bulgarian Flying Disc Informal Federation (BFDA)
    , Cambodia | Cambodia Flying Disc Association (CFDA)
    , Cayman Islands | Cayman Islands Ultimate Association (CIUA)
    , Chile | Asociación Chilena de Ultimate (AChU)
    , Costa Rica | Costa Rican Ultimate Frisbee Team (Tocadiscos)
    , Croatia | Croatian Flying Disc Federation (CFDF)
    , Indonesia | Indonesian Ultimate Discindo (IFDA)
    , Islamic Republic of Iran | Iranian Flying Disc Association (IRFDA)
    , Jordan | Jordan Flying Disc Federation (JFDF)
    , Kazakhstan | Kazakhstan Flying Disc Association (FFDRK)
    , Kenya | Kenya Flying Disc Association (KFDA)
    , Lebanon | Lebanon Flying Disc Association (LBN)
    , Malawi | Malawi Flying Disc Federation (MFDF)
    , Republic of Moldova | Moldovan Flying Disc Federation (MFDF)
    , Nicaragua | Federación de Disco Volador de Nicaragua (FEDIVONIC)
    , Qatar | Ultimate Players Association of Qatar (UPAQ)
    , Romania | Romania Flying Disc Association (RFDA)
    , Rwanda | Rwanda Ultimate Frisbee Association (RUFA)
    , Sri Lanka | Sri Lankan Flying Disc Association (SLFDA)
    , Tanzania | Tanzanian Flying Disc Association (TFDA)
    , Uruguay | Ultimate Frisbee Uruguay (UU)
    , Virgin Islands | US Virgin Islands Ultimate (USVIU)

History
Flying disc sport rose with the invention of plastic and celebrated its 50th anniversary in 2007. The early years of international flying disc play were dominated by the influence of the International Frisbee Association (IFA) which was founded by Ed Headrick in 1967 as the promotional arm of the Wham-O Manufacturing Company. Many of the international affiliates began as Wham-O distributorships that sponsored tours of well-known Frisbee athletes. Several groups of individual disc event stars like Ken Westerfield and Jim Kenner touring Canada in 1972. The brothers Jens and Erwin Velasquez and the team of Peter Bloeme and Dan "Stork" Roddick made several tours of Scandinavia and the rest of Europe in the mid-1970s; Jo Cahow and Stork went to Australia and Japan in 1976 and Victor Malafronte and Monica Lou toured Japan around the same time. Stork—starting as head of the sports marketing arm of the U.S.-based Wham-O in 1975—played a crucial role in encouraging the establishment of national flying disc associations (FDAs) in Sweden, Japan, Australia, and in many of the countries of Western Europe. The FDAs began with freestyle and accuracy competitions but as Ultimate and disc golf caught on, the associations began to broaden their focus.

The concept of an independent world organization for the development and coordination of all of the disc disciplines began in 1980 at an Atlanta, Georgia, meeting of 40 international disc organizers. A loose federation led by Jim Powers was formed from that meeting but never took off. The following year, the relatively well-established national flying disc associations of Europe formed the European Flying Disc Federation (EFDF). In 1983 Wham-O was sold to Kransco and the IFA was disbanded. Spurred on by the demise of the IFA, Stork called a meeting at the US Open Overall Championships in La Mirada, California. A plan was presented by Charlie Mead of England and a formal decision was made to establish a worldwide disc association in Örebro, Sweden during the 1984 European Overall Championships. This decision was confirmed later that year by other flying disc countries in Lucerne, Switzerland, during the World Ultimate and Guts Championships, and thus the World Flying Disc Federation (WFDF) was born.

The first WFDF Congress was held in Helsingborg, Sweden in July 1985, where the first set of statutes was adopted and the first board was elected. The first president was Charlie Mead (England), the first secretary Johan Lindgren (Sweden) and the first treasurer Brendan Nolan (Ireland). Membership was composed of the national flying disc associations and US-oriented organizations such as the Ultimate Players Association, Freestyle Players Associations, and Guts Players Association. Committees were established to oversee international play and rules for each of the disc disciplines. Over the remainder of the 1980s, WFDF took on an increasing role in overseeing and promoting international disc tournaments with Stork as president and Lindgren as secretary-treasurer.

In 1992, Robert L. "Nob" Rauch was elected President of WFDF and Juha Jalovaara become chair of the Ultimate Committee. Over the next two years, WFDF was reorganized to better reflect the increasing growth of Ultimate and the diversity of WFDF's membership.  The disc committee structure was simplified into a broad category of team sports (Ultimate and Guts) and individual events (golf and the overall disciplines). The role of the Rules Committee was expanded, headed by Stork, to ensure consistency and an annual rules book was printed. With a variety of representation, the categories of membership were further defined, with national associations able to join as regular, associate, or provisional (non-paying) members depending on level of participation and resources. WFDF's corporate standing was reorganized and incorporated in Colorado, obtaining US tax-exempt status. WFDF, with a fairly nominal budget, found help with the increasing use of e-mail that permitted reasonable communication and coordination. In 1994, the application to join the International World Games Association (IWGA)—championed by Fumio "Moro" Morooka of Japan—was prepared and eventually accepted by the IWGA leading to Ultimate's participation in the 2001 World Games in Akita, Japan, and in each of the subsequent competitions.

In May 2013, under the leadership WFDF President Robert L. "Nob" Rauch, WFDF was granted provisional recognition by the International Olympic Committee and it is now one of 42 sports that are members of the Association of IOC Recognised International Sports Federations.

Due to the impact of the global COVID-19 pandemic, WFDF canceled all its world championship events in both 2020 and 2021.  It is planning to recommence world championship events in Ultimate, Beach ultimate, Disc Golf, and Overall in 2022, and to participate in The World Games championships in Birmingham, Alabama, U.S. in July 2022 that had been postponed from 2021.

Disciplines
Disciplines:

Ultimate
Disc Golf
Freestyle
Guts
Overall
Beach Ultimate

Disc sports represented include: Ultimate (outdoor, indoor, beach), disc golf, field events (distance, accuracy, self caught flight, discathon), guts frisbee, double disc court, and freestyle.

Presidents

Event results

Regional events

WFDF World Ultimate Club Championship
Cincinnati, Ohio, U.S., 23–31 July 2022

Cincinnati, Ohio, U.S., 14–21 July 2018

Winnipeg, Manitoba, Canada, 29 July - 4 August 2018

Lecco, Italy, 2–9 August 2014

Prague, Czech Republic, 3–10 July 2010

Perth, Australia, 11–18 November 2006

Honolulu, US, 4–10 August 2002

St. Andrews, Scotland, 12–20 August 1999

Vancouver Canada, 27 July – 2 August 1997

Millfield United Kingdom, 22–29 July 1995

Madison, Wisconsin US, 24–31 July 1993

Toronto Canada, 22–28 July 1991

Cologne Germany, 26–30 July 1989

International World Games Ultimate Championship
Kaohsiung Taiwan, 19–21 July 2009
US
Japan
Australia

WFDF 2009 World Overall Flying Disc championships
Jacksonville, Florida, 9–12 July 2009
Open Division
Conrad Damon – US
Jack Cooksey – US
Harvey Brandt – US

Women's Division
Mary Lowry – US
Stina Persson – SWE
Marygrace Sorrentino – US

WFDF World Ultimate and Guts Championship (WUGC)
London, Great Britain, 18–25 June 2016

Sakai, Japan, 7–14 July 2012

Vancouver, Canada, 2–9 August 2008

Turku, Finland, 1–7 August 2004

Heilbronn, Germany, 12–20 August 2000

Blaine, Minnesota, US, 15–22 August 1998

Jönköping, Sweden, 10–17 August 1996

Colchester, United Kingdom, 21–28 August 1994

Utsunomiya, Japan, 17–23 August 1992

Oslo, Norway, 8–14 July 1990

Leuven, Belgium, 29 August – 3 September 1988

Colchester, United Kingdom, 25–31 August 1986

Lucerne, Switzerland, 2–9 September 1984

Gothenburg, Sweden, 29 August – 3 September 1983

See also
 Flying disc at the World Games
 Disc golf

Sources
WFDF Rankings Page
WFDF Disc Ultimate World Rankings
WUCC 2010
World Championship Results
World Club Championship Results

References

External links
World Flying Disc Federation
SportAccord
International World Games Association
USA Ultimate
Professional Disc Golf Association
Freestyle Players Association
European Flying Disc Federation
Ultimate Canada
European Ultimate Federation

IOC-recognised international federations
Ultimate (sport) governing bodies
Sports governing bodies in the United States
Flying Disc